Thomas Cobb is an American novelist and author of the 1987 novel Crazy Heart   which was adapted into the 2010 Academy Award winning 2009 film Crazy Heart.

Life and career
Raised in Tucson, Arizona, Cobb acquired an MFA from the University of Arizona. He earned a PhD from the University of Houston, where he studied fiction writing with Donald Barthelme.  Barthelme also advised him on the writing of Crazy Heart.

Cobb has taught at Eastern Arizona College and in the Arizona State Prison System. Since 1987, he has been a member of the faculty of Rhode Island College and is Professor of English and Director of Performing & Fine Arts Commission. He teaches fiction writing and literature and was the director of the program from 1987 to 2005. In 2010, he received the Rhode Island College Alumni Faculty Award.

Bibliography

Novels
 Crazy Heart (1987)
 Shavetail (2009)
 With Blood in Their Eyes (2012)
 Darkness the Color of Snow (2015)

Short stories
 Acts of Contrition (2003)

References

External links
 Thomas Cobb's website (Accessed 26th September 2010)

Living people
20th-century American novelists
Writers from Rhode Island
University of Houston alumni
Eastern Arizona College faculty
American male novelists
20th-century American male writers
Novelists from Arizona
Year of birth missing (living people)